Rudi Milton Brewster (May 8, 1932 – September 7, 2012) was a United States district judge of the United States District Court for the Southern District of California, best known for 2006 ruling in a patent infringements suit against Microsoft tied to the licensing of the MP3 format.

Education and career

Born in Sioux Falls, South Dakota, Brewster received an A.B. from the Woodrow Wilson School of Public and International Affairs at Princeton University in 1954 after completing a 130-page long senior thesis titled "The Economic Section, Antitrust Division: Analysis of Purposes and Functions." While a student at Princeton, Brewster was a member of the Navy ROTC program. He served in the United States Navy as an aviator from 1954 to 1957, and thereafter attended Stanford Law School while in the United States Naval Reserve. He earned a Juris Doctor from Stanford Law School in 1960, and went into private practice in San Diego, California, at the law firm of Gray, Cary, Ames & Frye (now a part of DLA Piper). He left the Naval Reserve in 1981.

Federal judicial service

On May 24, 1984, President Ronald Reagan nominated Brewster to the United States District Court for the Southern District of California, to a seat vacated by Judge Howard B. Turrentine. He was confirmed by the United States Senate on June 15, 1984, and received commission the same day. He took his oath of office on June 29, 1984. He assumed senior status on July 1, 1998, serving in that status until his death of complications of pneumonia on September 7, 2012, in La Jolla, California.

Notable cases

Brewster tossed out a February 2006 ruling against Microsoft for patent infringements tied to the licensing of the MP3 format, worth $1.5 billion. He also ruled in United States v. Bauer.

Memberships and other service

Brewster held a fellowship with the American College of Trial Lawyers, was an associate of the American Board of Trial Advocates and served as president and chancellor: Louis M. Welsh Inn of Court.  He was also a member of the J. Clifford Wallace Inn of Court.

References

Sources

External links
 Microsoft ruling
 Microsoft Off The Hook In $1.5 Billion Patent Suit
 Judge overturns $1.5-bn ruling against Microsoft
 Microsoft Avoids Paying $1.5 Billion To Alcatel-Lucent, For Now
 Microsoft sees $1.5bn verdict chucked out

People from Sioux Falls, South Dakota
Princeton School of Public and International Affairs alumni
Stanford Law School alumni
Judges of the United States District Court for the Southern District of California
United States district court judges appointed by Ronald Reagan
20th-century American judges
American aviators
1932 births
2012 deaths